Sajjad Shahid is a native of Hyderabad, India, and a historian, architecture conservator and columnist. He is a visiting professor at University of Hyderabad. Sajjad's articles are published in The Times of India and The Hindu. Sajjad is the former convener of "Centre for Deccan studies Hyderabad" and currently associated with INTACH in preserving Hyderabad historical and cultural history and monuments. He is associated with a conservatory team working for the preservation of Qutb Shahi tombs under Aga Khan Trust for Culture. 
Sajjad father is Hossaini Shahid and mother is Zeenat Sajida both were active members of in the Progressive Writers Association. He is an alumnus of Hyderabad Public School and completed civil engineer from Aligarh Muslim University.

References

Writers from Hyderabad, India
20th-century Indian writers
20th-century Indian male writers
Living people
Year of birth missing (living people)